Matthias Breitkreutz (born 12 May 1971) is a German former professional footballer who played as a midfielder.

Born in Crivitz, Mecklenburg-Vorpommern, he played during his career for BFC Dynamo, SG Bergmann-Borsig, Aston Villa F.C., FC Hansa Rostock, Arminia Bielefeld, 1. FC Saarbrücken, VfB Leipzig, and FC Augsburg.

References

External links
 

1971 births
Living people
People from Crivitz
People from Bezirk Schwerin
German footballers
East German footballers
Footballers from Mecklenburg-Western Pomerania
Association football midfielders
Premier League players
Berliner FC Dynamo players
SG Bergmann-Borsig players
Aston Villa F.C. players
FC Hansa Rostock players
Arminia Bielefeld players
1. FC Saarbrücken players
1. FC Lokomotive Leipzig players
FC Augsburg players
Bundesliga players
2. Bundesliga players
German expatriate footballers
German expatriate sportspeople in England
Expatriate footballers in England